Aragosta a colazione (internationally released as Lobster for Breakfast) is a 1979 Italian comedy film directed by Giorgio Capitani.

For his performance in this film and in Il ladrone, Enrico Montesano was awarded with a Special David di Donatello.

Cast 
 Enrico Montesano as  Enrico Tucci 
 Claude Brasseur as Mario Spinosi 
 Janet Agren as  Monique 
 Claudine Auger as  Carla Spinosi 
 Silvia Dionisio as  Matilde Tucci
 Adriana Innocenti as  Miss Duchamp
 Renato Mori as  Accountant Trocchia
 Roberto Della Casa as Sommelier

See also 
List of Italian films of 1979

References

External links

1979 films
Commedia all'italiana
Italian comedy films
Films set in Rome
Films directed by Giorgio Capitani
Films scored by Piero Umiliani
1979 comedy films
1970s Italian films